Peter III of Rosenberg (1381 – 7 December 1406) was a Czech nobleman from the Rosenberg family.

Biography 
Peter was born as the eldest son of Henry III of Rosenberg and his first wife Barbara of Schaunberg. He was the first in line to succeed his father. He got engaged on 14 December 1396 to Anna Landgraves of Leuchtenberg and Countess of Hals. However, the wedding did not take place because Peter died at the age of 25. After the death of his father in 1412, Peter's half-brother Oldřich II became the head of the Rosenberg family.

References

Bibliography 
 
 

1381 births
1406 deaths
Czech nobility
Rosenberg family